The Fred Whipple Award, established in 1989 by the Planetary Sciences Section of the American Geophysical Union, is presented to an individual who makes an outstanding contribution to the field of planetary science. The award was established to honor Fred Whipple.  The Whipple Award includes an opportunity to present an invited lecture during the American Geophysical Union Fall Meeting.

Recipients
Source: AGU

See also

 List of astronomy awards
 List of geophysics awards
 List of awards named after people

References

American Geophysical Union awards
Astronomy prizes
Awards established in 1989